The Karachi Shipyard & Engineering Works Limited (KS&EW) is a Pakistani State-owned Defence Enterprise & military corporation situated in the West Wharf in Karachi, Sindh in Pakistan.

KS&EW is the oldest & the singular shipyard in Pakistan, catering for shipbuilding, ship repair and general heavy engineering. It has built numerous cargo ships, oil tankers, tugboats and support vessels, landing craft, naval vessels and submarines for the Pakistani Navy. It also builds and repairs for Pakistan National Shipping Corporation, Karachi Port Trust, Port Qasim Authority and for a wide range of customers in the private sector in Pakistan. Company's entire shares are owned by the Government of Pakistan under the administrative control of Ministry of Defence.

The current Managing Director of KS&EW is Rear Admiral Ather Saleem. Karachi Shipyard & Engineering Works acquired certification of ISO 9001 in 2000.

History 
It was established in the mid fifties as a project of Pakistan Industrial Development Corporation (PIDC) and was later incorporated as a public limited company in 1956 which is managed by a Board of Directors and a Managing Director. Yard is spread across 71 acres and located at West Wharf in Karachi & equipped with a large shipbuilding hall, three block fabrication areas, three shipbuilding berths, two dry docks, a machine shop, a grit blasting and painting facility, a 7321 tons capacity ship lift and transfer system, 12 parking stations.

Projects

17,000 Ton Fleet Tanker 
A contract was signed on 22 January 2013 between the Ministry of Defence Production, Pakistan and STM , Turkey to construct a 17000 ton fleet tanker for the Pakistani Navy. The Kit of Material was provided by STM and the construction, outfitting took place at KS&EW. The construction of the vessel started on 27 November 2013 and it was launched on 19 August 2016. This is the largest warship built in Pakistan till date.

Agosta 90B
In the 1990s KS&EW constructed two Agosta 90B submarines for the Pakistani Navy. These were built under a transfer of technology from DCNS, France. The technology was mostly related to construction of the pressure hull and out-fitting of the submarine.  The third submarine, PNS Hamza, was constructed with MESMA AIP unit, while the first two (PNS Khalid and PNS Saad) will be retro-fitted during their next overhauls with a "plug" containing a MESMA AIP unit. The submarine's hull will be cut and the plug inserted. The second MESMA unit was shipped in June 2011.

MILGEM Class Corvette (warship) 
MILGEM Class Corvette will be the most technologically advanced surface platforms of the Pakistan Navy fleet. Keel Laying ceremony of third MILGEM class warship held. The warship will complete in 2024.

Projects 
The next submarine project will see KS&EW jointly involved with Chinese company CSOC (China Shipbuilding & Offshore International Co. Ltd.) in the design and construction of 8 submarines equipped with air-independent propulsion (AIP). These will be designed to Pakistani specifications and four will be built at a CSOC shipyard in China, while four will be constructed by KS&EW. It is believed that little upgrading of facilities is required because much of the current infrastructure meets the requirements. The preliminary negotiations were reported to be completed in March 2011. It was earlier believed that the project would involve China's Type-041 Yuan class submarine, which had been mentioned by Admiral Noman Bashir, Chief of Naval Staff, several times since 2009.

Production

Merchant vessels
 Al-Abbas - first one was built in 1967 for Muhammadi Steamship Company Limited.
 MV Lalazar - A 13,300 DWT Cargo Vessel was built for National Shipping Corporation, Pakistan. Delivered on 20th Nov 1974.
 MV Hetian - A 13,160 DWT Cargo Vessel was built for China National Machinery Import & Export Corporation, China, in 1978.
 MV Islamabad - MV Islamabad is the largest general cargo and container ship built at KS&EW with 17,200 DWT. The ship is in service with Pakistan National Shipping Corporation.
 You Ti 20 - A 17,000 TDW Bulk Carrier You Yi 20 was built in 1992 for China National Machinery Import & Export Corporation.

Naval vessels

Frigates
 PNS Aslat of the F-22P Zulfiquar class frigate
 PNS Shah Jahan

Corvettes
 2 corvettes of the PN MILGEM class corvette

Multi-Purpose Patrol craft
 PNS Dehshat of the Azmat class missile boat
 PNS Jurrat & PNS Quwwat of the Jurrat class missile boat
 PNS Jalalat & PNS Shujaat of the Jalalat II class missile boat
 PNS Larkana & PNS Rajshahi of the Larkana class Gunboat
 Maritime Patrol Vessels (600 and 1500 tonnes displacement) for Pakistan Maritime Security Agency. Both commissioned.

Mine Countermeasure Vessels
 PNS Mujahid of the Tripartite-class minehunter

Submarines
 PNS Hamza & PNS Saad of Agosta 90B class submarine class
 PNS Khalid submarine

Auxiliary Vessels
 PNS Moawin (A39)- 17,000 Tons Fleet Tanker 
 PNS Bhit Shah - Split-Hopper Barge
 PNS Kalmat & PNS Gwader - Coastal Tankers
 PNS Madadgar & PNS Rasadgar - Small Tanker Cum Utility Ship

See also
 Defence industry of Pakistan
 List of shipbuilders and shipyards

References

External links
 
 Karachi Shipyard & Engineering Works - Profile

Manufacturing companies based in Karachi
Shipbuilding companies of Pakistan
Shipyards of Pakistan
Pakistan Navy bases
Defence companies of Pakistan
Pakistani companies established in 1957
Vehicle manufacturing companies established in 1957
Engineering companies of Pakistan
Pakistan Navy submarine bases
Government-owned companies of Pakistan
Pakistan federal departments and agencies